Northwest School District may refer to:
 Northwest Independent School District
 Northwest R-I School District